Cynthia Lee Macdonald (February 2, 1928 – August 3, 2015) was an American poet, educator, and psychoanalyst.

Life
Macdonald was born in Manhattan to screenwriter Leonard Macdonald and his wife Dorothy Kiam Macdonald.

She earned a B.A. in English from Bennington College in 1950 and pursued studies in voice at the Mannes School of Music in 1951-1952. She pursued a career in opera and concert singing from 1953-1966. After changing her focus to poetry, Macdonald received a master's degree in writing and literature from Sarah Lawrence College.

She went on to teach creative writing at Sarah Lawrence University and Johns Hopkins University. She co-founded the Creative Writing Program at the University of Houston with fellow poet Stanley Plumly in 1979. She was a member of the English Department at the University of Houston until her retirement in 2004, receiving the Esther Farfel Award for faculty excellence.

Macdonald also worked as a psychoanalyst, having received a certification from the Houston-Galveston Psychoanalytic Institute in 1986. She specialized in working with people who had writer's block.

She was a member of the board of directors of the Association of Writers & Writing Programs.

She wrote the libretto for The Rehearsal (1978), an opera by Thomas Benjamin.

She was the mother of American artist Jennifer Macdonald.

Awards
 Three NEA grants (two for poetry and one for a libretto) 
 1977 National Academy and Institute of Arts and Letters award "for "recognition of the contribution of her poetry", 1977
 1983 Guggenheim Fellowship in Poetry
 1992 O. B. Hardison, Jr. Poetry Prize

Works
"Discomfiting the Absolute Splendor", Poetry Foundation
"The Impossible May Be Possible", Ploughshares (Spring 1999)

Books

References

External links
 
 "Cynthia Macdonald." Encyclopædia Britannica. 2009. Encyclopædia Britannica Online. 18 Nov. 2009

1928 births
2015 deaths
20th-century American poets
Baylor College of Medicine alumni
Bennington College alumni
Johns Hopkins University faculty
Mannes School of Music alumni
Sarah Lawrence College alumni
Sarah Lawrence College faculty
University of Houston faculty
American women poets
20th-century American women writers
Writers from Manhattan
American women academics
21st-century American women